Mantua (Lombard and ) is a city and comune in Lombardy, Italy, and capital of the province of the same name.

In 2016, Mantua was designated as the Italian Capital of Culture. In 2017, it was named as the European Capital of Gastronomy, included in the Eastern Lombardy District (together with the cities of Bergamo, Brescia, and Cremona).

In 2008, Mantua's centro storico (old town) and Sabbioneta were declared by UNESCO to be a World Heritage Site. Mantua's historic power and influence under the Gonzaga family has made it one of the main artistic, cultural, and especially musical hubs of Northern Italy and the country as a whole. Having one of the most splendid courts of Europe of the fifteenth, sixteenth, and early seventeenth centuries. Mantua is noted for its significant role in the history of opera; the city is also known for its architectural treasures and artifacts, elegant palaces, and the medieval and Renaissance cityscape. It is the city where the composer Monteverdi premiered his opera L'Orfeo and to where Romeo was banished in Shakespeare's play Romeo and Juliet. It is the nearest town to the birthplace of the Roman poet Virgil, who is commemorated by a statue at the lakeside park "Piazza Virgiliana".

Mantua is surrounded on three sides by artificial lakes, created during the 12th century as the city's defence system. These lakes receive water from the Mincio River, a tributary of the Po River which descends from Lake Garda. The three lakes are called Lago Superiore, Lago di Mezzo, and Lago Inferiore ("Upper", "Middle", and "Lower" Lakes, respectively). A fourth lake, Lake Pajolo, which once served as a defensive water ring around the city, dried up at the end of the 18th century.

The area and its environs are important not only in naturalistic terms, but also anthropologically and historically; research has highlighted a number of human settlements scattered between Barche di Solferino and Bande di Cavriana, Castellaro and Isolone del Mincio. These dated, without interruption, from Neolithic times (5th–4th millennium BC) to the Bronze Age (2nd–1st millennium BC) and the Gallic phases (2nd–1st centuries BC), and ended with Roman residential settlements, which could be traced to the 3rd century AD.

In 2017, Legambiente ranked Mantua as the best Italian city for the quality of the life and environment.

History

Mantua was an island settlement which was first established about the year 2000 BC on the banks of River Mincio, which flows from Lake Garda to the Adriatic Sea. In the 6th century BC, Mantua was an Etruscan village which, in the Etruscan tradition, was re-founded by Ocnus.

The name may derive from the Etruscan god Mantus. After being conquered by the Cenomani, a Gallic tribe, Mantua was subsequently fought between the first and second Punic wars against the Romans, who attributed its name to Manto, a daughter of Tiresias. This territory was later populated by veteran soldiers of Augustus. Mantua's most famous ancient citizen is the poet Virgil, or Publius Vergilius Maro (Mantua me genuit), who was born in the year 70 BC at a village near the city which is now known as Virgilio.

After the Fall of the Roman Empire
After the fall of the Western Roman Empire at the hands of Odoacer in 476 AD, Mantua was, along with the rest of Italy, conquered by the Ostrogoths. It was retaken by the Eastern Roman Empire in the middle of the 6th century following the Gothic war but was subsequently lost again to the Lombards. They were in turn conquered by Charlemagne in 774, thus incorporating Mantua into the Frankish Empire. Partitions of the empire (due to the Franks' use of partible inheritance) in the Treaties of Verdun and Prüm led to Mantua passing to Middle Francia in 843, then the Kingdom of Italy in 855. In 962 Italy was invaded by King Otto I of Germany, and Mantua thus became a vassal of the newly formed Holy Roman Empire.

In the 11th century, Mantua became a possession of Boniface of Canossa, marquis of Tuscany. The last ruler of that family was the countess Matilda of Canossa (d. 1115), who, according to legend, ordered the construction of the precious Rotonda di San Lorenzo (or St. Lawrence's Roundchurch) in 1082. The Rotonda still exists today and was renovated in 2013.

Free Imperial City of Mantua 
After the death of Matilda of Canossa, Mantua became a free commune and strenuously defended itself from the influence of the Holy Roman Empire during the 12th and 13th centuries. In 1198, Alberto Pitentino altered the course of River Mincio, creating what the Mantuans call "the four lakes" to reinforce the city's natural protection. Three of these lakes still remain today and the fourth one, which ran through the centre of town, was reclaimed during the 18th century.

Podesteria Rule

From 1215, the city was ruled under the podesteria of the Guelph poet-statesman Rambertino Buvalelli.

During the struggle between the Guelphs and the Ghibellines, Pinamonte Bonacolsi took advantage of the chaotic situation to seize power of the podesteria in 1273. He was declared the Captain General of the People. The Bonacolsi family ruled Mantua for the next two generations and made it more prosperous and artistically beautiful. On 16 August 1328 Luigi Gonzaga, an official in Bonacolsi's podesteria, and his family staged a public revolt in Mantua and forced a coup d'état on the last Bonacolsi ruler, Rinaldo.

House of Gonzaga

Ludovico Gonzaga, who had been Podestà of Mantua since 1318, was duly elected Capitano del popolo. The Gonzagas built new walls with five gates and renovated the city in the 14th century; however, the political situation did not settle until the third ruler of Gonzaga, Ludovico III Gonzaga, who eliminated his relatives and centralised power to himself. During the Italian Renaissance, the Gonzaga family softened their despotic rule and further raised the level of culture and refinement in Mantua. Mantua became a significant center of Renaissance art and humanism. Marquis Gianfrancesco Gonzaga had brought Vittorino da Feltre to Mantua in 1423 to open his famous humanist school, the Casa Giocosa.

Isabella d'Este, Marchioness of Mantua, married Francesco II Gonzaga, Marquess of Mantua in 1490. When she moved to Mantua from Ferrara (she was the daughter of Duke Ercole the ruler of Ferrara) she created her famous studiolo firstly in Castello di San Giorgio for which she commissioned paintings from Mantegna, Perugino and Lorenzo Costa. She later moved her studiolo to the Corte Vecchia and commissioned two paintings from Correggio to join the five from Castello di San Giorgio. It was unusual for a woman to have a studiolo in 15th century Italy given they were regarded as masculine spaces. Isabella was a vociferous collector and such was her reputation that Niccolò da Corregio called her 'la prima donna del mondo'.

Through a payment of 120,000 golden florins in 1433, Gianfrancesco I was appointed Marquis of Mantua by the Emperor Sigismund, whose niece Barbara of Brandenburg married his son, Ludovico. In 1459, Pope Pius II held the Council of Mantua to proclaim a crusade against the Turks. Under Ludovico and his heirs, the famous Renaissance painter Andrea Mantegna worked in Mantua as court painter, producing some of his most outstanding works.

Duchy of Mantua

The first Duke of Mantua was Federico II Gonzaga, who acquired the title from the Holy Roman Emperor Charles V in 1530. Federico commissioned Giulio Romano to build the famous Palazzo Te, on the periphery of the city, and profoundly improved the city. In the late 16th century, Claudio Monteverdi came to Mantua from his native Cremona. He worked for the court of Vincenzo I Gonzaga, first as a singer and violist, then as music director, marrying the court singer Claudia Cattaneo in 1599.

From Gonzaga to Habsburg

In 1627, the direct line of the Gonzaga family came to an end with the vicious and weak Vincenzo II, and Mantua slowly declined under the new rulers, the Gonzaga-Nevers, a cadet French branch of the family. The War of the Mantuan Succession broke out, and in 1630 an Imperial army of 36,000 mercenaries under Matthias Gallas and Johann von Aldringen besieged and sacked Mantua, bringing the plague with them. Ferdinand Carlo IV, an inept ruler, whose only interest was in holding parties and theatrical shows, allied with France in the War of the Spanish Succession. After the French defeat, he took refuge in Venice and carried with him a thousand pictures. At his death in 1708, the Duke of Mantua was declared deposed and his family of Gonzaga lost Mantua forever in favour of the Habsburgs of Austria.

Under Austrian rule, Mantua enjoyed a revival and during this period the Royal Academy of Sciences, Letters and Arts, the Scientific Theatre, and numerous palaces were built.

Napoleonic Wars

In 1786, ten years before Napoleon Bonaparte's campaign of Europe, the Austrian Duchy of Mantua briefly united with the Duchy of Milan until 1791.

On 4 June 1796 Mantua was besieged by Napoleon's army as a move against Austria, who had joined the First Coalition against France. Austrian and Russian attempts to break the siege failed, but they were able to spread the French forces thinly enough that the siege was abandoned on 31 July. After diverting the French forces elsewhere, the French resumed the siege on August 24. In early February 1797, the city surrendered and the region came under French administration. Two years later, in 1799, the city was recaptured by the Austrians after the Siege of Mantua (1799).

Later, the city again passed into Napoleon's control and became a part of Napoleon's Kingdom of Italy. In 1810 Andreas Hofer was shot by Porta Giulia, a gate of the town at Borgo di Porto (Cittadella) for leading the insurrection in the County of Tyrol against Napoleon.

Kingdom of Lombardy–Venetia

After the brief period of French rule, Mantua returned to Austria in 1814, becoming one of the Quadrilatero fortress cities in northern Italy. Under the Congress of Vienna (1815), Mantua became a province in the Austrian Empire's Kingdom of Lombardy–Venetia. Agitation against Austria, however, culminated in a revolt which lasted from 1851 to 1855, but it was finally suppressed by the Austrian army. One of the most famous episodes of the Italian Risorgimento took place in the valley of the Belfiore, where a group of rebels was hanged by the Austrians.

Unification of Italy

At the Battle of Solferino (Second Italian War of Independence) in 1859, the House of Savoy's Piedmont-Sardinia sided with the French Emperor Napoleon III against the Austrian Empire. Following Austria's defeat, Lombardy was ceded to France, who transferred Lombardy to Piedmont-Sardinia in return for Nice and Savoy.

Mantua, although a constituent province of Lombardy, still remained under the Austrian Empire along with Venetia. In 1866, Prussia-led North German Confederation sided with the newly established, Piedmont-led Kingdom of Italy against the Austrian Empire in the Third Italian War of Independence. The quick defeat of Austria led to its withdrawal of the Kingdom of Venetia (including the capital city, Venice). Mantua reconnected with the region of Lombardy and was incorporated into the Kingdom of Italy.

Monuments and sites of interest

The Gonzagas protected the arts and culture, and were hosts to several important artists such as Leone Battista Alberti, Andrea Mantegna, Giulio Romano, Donatello, Peter Paul Rubens, Pisanello, Domenico Fetti, Luca Fancelli and Nicolò Sebregondi. Though many of the masterworks have been dispersed, the cultural value of Mantua is nonetheless outstanding, with many of Mantua's patrician and ecclesiastical buildings being uniquely important examples of Italian architecture.

Religious architecture and sites 
 Basilica of Sant'Andrea was begun in 1462 according to designs by Leon Battista Alberti but was finished only in the 18th century when was built the massive dome designed by Filippo Juvarra.
 Duomo (Cathedral of St Peter the Apostle)
 Rotonda di San Lorenzo
 Church of San Sebastiano
 Museo diocesano Francesco Gonzaga, art museum displaying sacred artworks, armor, coins, tapestries, pottery, ancient and contemporary paintings. 
 Santa Paola, church built in the early 15th century by the will of Marchioness Paola Malatesta, wife of Francesco I. Architects such as Luca Fancelli and Giulio Romano collaborated to its construction. It houses the tombs of five members of the Gonzaga family, including those of Paola and of Francesco II.
 Santa Maria del Gradaro, church built starting from 1256 on the site where, according to the tradition, Saint Longinus was buried. In 1772 it became a store, and was reconsecrated only in the 1950s.

Secular architecture and sites
 Palazzo Te (1525–1535), semi-rural palace of Giulio Romano (who lived in Mantua in his final years) in the mature Renaissance style, with some hints of a post-Raphaelian mannerism. It was the summer residential villa of Frederick II of Gonzaga. It hosts the Museo Civico (with the donations of Arnoldo Mondadori, one of the most important Italian publishers, and Ugo Sissa, a Mantuan architect who worked in Iraq from where he brought back important Mesopotamian artworks).
 Palazzo Ducale, famous residence of the Gonzaga family, made up of a number of buildings, courtyards and gardens gathered around the Palazzo del Capitano, the Magna Domus and the Castle of St. George with the Camera degli Sposi, a room frescoed by Andrea Mantegna.
 Palazzo Vescovile ("Bishops Palace")
 Palazzo degli Uberti
 Palazzo d'Arco, a Neoclassical palace erected by the eponymous noble family from Trento starting from 1746. It is home to a museum and painting gallery with works by Bernardino Luini, Alessandro Magnasco, Frans Pourbus the Younger, Anthony van Dyck and a painting cycle by Giuseppe Bazzani.
 Torre della Gabbia ("Cage Tower")
 Palazzo del Podestà, Mantua 
 Palazzo della Ragione with the Torre dell'Orologio
 Palazzo Bonacolsi
 Palazzo Valenti Gonzaga, an example of Baroque architecture and decoration, with frescoes attributed to Flemish painter Frans Geffels. The façade of the palace was designed by Nicolò Sebregondi.
 Bibiena Theater, also known as the Teatro Scientifico, designed by Antonio Bibiena in 1767–1769. Inaugurated officially on 3 December 1769 and on 16 January 1770, thirteen-year-old Wolfgang Amadeus Mozart played a concert.
 Casa del Mercato, a frescoed Renaissance building designed by Luca Fancelli in 1462 and later used by Andrea Mantegna.
 House of Mantegna, facing the church of San Sebastiano. It was built by the eponymous artist starting from 1476, and has plan with a circular internal court included within an external square building. It is now used for temporary exhibitions.

Transport

Car
By car, Mantova can be reached on the A4 (Milan-Venice) Highway up to Verona, then the A22 (Brennero-Modena) Highway. Alternatively, the city can be reached from Milan on the State Road 415 (Milan-Cremona) to Cremona and from there State Road 10 (Cremona-Mantova), or from Verona on the State Road 62.

Railway
Mantova railway station, opened in 1873, lies on the train routes of Milan-Codogno-Cremona-Mantua and Verona-Mantua-Modena. The station is a terminus for three regional lines, to Cremona and Milan, to Monselice, and to Verona Porta Nuova and Modena. Trenitalia operates a daily high-speed connection with Rome.

Air
The closest airport is Verona-Villafranca Airport. The direct shuttle bus service running to and from Mantova railway station was canceled on 1 January 2015. Public connection is now provided by the airport bus running to and from Verona Porta Nuova railway station, and the Verona-Mantova railway line.

Bus
Local bus services, urbano (within the city area and suburbs) and interurbano (within the surrounding towns and villages) are provided by APAM.

Cuisine

Miscellaneous
 An annual survey of Legambiente (an ecologist movement of Italy) in 2005 declared Mantua the most 'liveable' city of the country. The study was based on levels of pollution, quality of life, traffic, and public transport, among other criteria.
 The body of Saint Longinus, twice recovered and lost, was asserted to have been found once more at Mantua in 1304, together with the Holy Sponge stained with Christ's blood.
 The composer Claudio Monteverdi was employed by Vincenzo Gonzaga, Duke of Mantua, ruler of the Duchy of Mantua, when he wrote the Vespro della Beata Vergine, published in 1610. Vincenzo's son and successor in 1612, Francesco IV Gonzaga, Duke of Mantua, summarily sacked Monteverdi, who went on to a more prestigious position at the Basilica of San Marco, Venice.
 Since 1997 Mantua has hosted the Festivaletteratura, one of the most renowned literary events in Europe.
 In 2007 the remains of two people, known as the Lovers of Valdaro, were discovered during the construction of a factory. The remains are thought to be between 5000 and 6000 years old. It is speculated that the remains are of two young lovers because the two skeletons appear to be embracing.
 In May 2012, a deadly earthquake struck Northern Italy, causing damage to some historic buildings in Mantua, including the Palazzo Ducale. After months of repair, the Palazzo reopened its doors in September 2012.
 The composer Antonio Vivaldi was employed by the Governor of Mantua in the period 1718–1720. Mantua inspired him to write the Four Seasons and has been a city of note in Italy to enjoy the seasonal variations since.

Government

Since local government political reorganization in 1993, Mantua has been governed by the City Council of Mantua. Voters elect directly 33 councilors and the Mayor of Mantua every five years. The current Mayor of Mantua is Mattia Palazzi (PD), elected on 15 June 2015.

Twin towns – sister cities
Mantua is twinned with:

 Charleville-Mézières, France, 1959
 Nevers, France, 1959
 Pushkin, Russia, 1993
 Weingarten, Germany, 1998
 Madison, United States, 2001
 Ōmihachiman, Japan, 2005
 Oradea, Romania, 2005

Notable citizens 

 Andrea Andreani (1540–1623), engraver on wood, used chiaroscuro.
 Marcus Antonius Antimachus (c. 1473 – 1552), pioneer of Renaissance Greek language teaching.
 Giovanni Battista Bertani (1516–1576), architect.
 Giacomo Benefatti (1304–1332), Roman Catholic Bishop.
 Constanzo Beschi, (1680–1742), a well known Tamil poet. He is known as Vīramāmunivar in Tamil.
 Saverio Bettinelli (1718–1808), Jesuit writer, polymath, dramatist, polemicist, poet, and literary critic.
 Baldassare Castiglione (1478–1529), count of Casatico, courtier, diplomat, soldier and author.
 Gino Fano (1871–1952), mathematician.
 Matteo Cressoni (born 1984), racing driver
 Federigo Giambelli (16th & 17th C.), military and civil engineer, worked in Spain.
 St. Aloysius Gonzaga (1568-1591), aristocrat and Jesuit.
 Pietro Giovanni Guarneri (1655–1720), violin maker of the Guarneri family, left Cremona in 1679, eventually establishing himself in Mantua.
 Learco Guerra (1902–1963), professional road racing cyclist, in 1931 won the world cycling championship.
 Alfredo Guzzoni (1877–1965), Italian Army General in World War II
 Alberto Jori (born 1965), neo-aristotelian philosopher.
 Lovers of Valdaro a pair of human skeletons dated approx 6,000 years old.
 Claudio Monteverdi (ca.1567 – 1643), composer and violist to the duke of Mantua.
 Tazio Nuvolari (1892–1953), motorcycle and racecar driver.
 Ippolito Nievo (1831–1861), writer, journalist and patriot.
 Elisabetta Picenardi (1428-1468), Italian Roman Catholic, Servite Order professed member.
 Dave Rodgers (born 1963), musician and singer
 Pietro Pomponazzi (1462–1525), an Italian philosopher. He is sometimes known by his Latin name, Petrus Pomponatius.
 Samuel Romanelli (1757–1814), Jewish intellectual and travel writer who published the first modern ethnography of Moroccan Jewry
 Salamone Rossi (ca.1570 – 1630), Jewish violinist and composer who served as concertmaster of the Mantua court from 1587 until 1628.
 Giuseppe Sarto (1835–1914), appointed Bishop in 1884 before he became Pope Pius X in 1903.
 Stefano Scarampella (1843–1925), violin maker, left Brescia and moved to Mantua in 1886.
Ada Sacchi Simonetta (1874–1944), librarian and women's rights activist.
 Leone de' Sommi (ca.1525 – ca.1590), theater director and writer.
 Sordello or Sordel, a 13th-century Lombard troubadour, born in the municipality of Goito in the province of Mantua.
 Franca Sozzani (1950–2016), editor-in-chief at Vogue Italia was born here.
 Virgil (70 BCE–19 BCE), a classical Roman poet, born near Mantua.

In fiction
 In William Shakespeare's Romeo and Juliet, Romeo is punished for killing Tybalt: he is exiled from Verona to Mantua. The plan was for both Romeo and Juliet to escape Verona after Juliet woke up from her fake death, but that never happened, because Romeo died, and she stabbed herself to death.
 In William Shakespeare's play The Taming of the Shrew, the schoolmaster who pretends to be Lucentio's father, Vincentio, is from Mantua. Hortensio is presented as "Licio, born in Mantua". Another character simply named "Pedant" states that he is from Mantua. 
 Giuseppe Verdi's opera Rigoletto (based on Victor Hugo's play Le roi s'amuse) is set in Mantua. Austro-Hungarian authorities in Venice forced him to move the action from France to Mantua. A medieval building with portico and 15th-century loggia in Mantua is said to be "Rigoletto's house". It was actually the house of the cathedral regulars. It was chosen by the Gonzaga family as the residence of the legendary fool who was then used by Verdi in his opera.

See also
 Roman Catholic Diocese of Mantova
Rocca di Manerba del Garda (Lombardy)

References

Bibliography

External links

 
 Mantova Tourism 
 Palazzo Te (in Italian)
 Palazzo Ducale (in Italian)
 A Mantova To know and to see Mantua
 Tourist guide in Mantua A native guide from Mantua
 Mantovani Nel Mondo Page dedicated to Mantovani worldwide.
 Photo gallery made by a UNESCO photographer
 Mantua on The Campanile Project

 
Cities and towns in Lombardy
Etruscan cities
Roman towns and cities in Italy
World Heritage Sites in Italy